Forty-two-year-old Molla Mallory defeated Elizabeth Ryan 4–6, 6–4, 9–7 in the final to win the women's singles tennis title at the 1926 U.S. National Championships. The event was held at the West Side Tennis Club, Forest Hills, New York City. Mallory became the oldest US Open champion in history. It was Mallory's eighth and final U.S. National singles title.

Draw

Final eight

References

1926
1926 in women's tennis
1926 in American women's sports
Women's Singles
1926 in New York City
1926 in sports in New York (state)
Women's sports in New York (state)